Alicka Ampry-Samuel is an American lawyer and politician. A Democrat, she served as a New York City Council member for the 41st district. The district included portions of Bedford-Stuyvesant, Ocean Hill-Brownsville, East Flatbush, Crown Heights in Brooklyn.

In an upset, Ampry-Samuel was defeated for re-election in 2021 by Darlene Mealy, the former Council member whom Ampry-Samuel had succeeded four years earlier.

Early life and education
Ampry-Samuel was born and raised in Brownsville, one of the most impoverished neighborhoods of Brooklyn. She graduated from North Carolina A&T State University and the CUNY School of Law.

Career
Ampry-Samuel first ran for the City Council in 2005, but lost to Darlene Mealy in the Democratic primary.

Prior to public office, Ampry-Samuel worked as a Child Protective Specialist with the NYC Administration for Children Services.

From 2012 to 2014, during a stint at the US Embassy in Ghana, she worked as a communication and outreach specialist for the United States Agency for International Development and subsequently on a human rights portfolio in the Embassy’s Political Office. She also served as Chief of Staff for State Assemblywoman Latrice Walker.

New York City Council
Three-term Councilwoman Darlene Mealy was term-limited in 2017 and unable to seek another term. Ampry-Samuel was one of nine Democrats who vied to replace her, and she won the Democratic primary with just over 31% of the vote.  She would go on to win the general election in the overwhelmingly Democratic district with over 95% of the vote.

Ampry-Samuel was sworn into office on January 1, 2018.

Housing and Urban Development
Ampry-Samuel was sworn into office as the Regional Administrator for New York and New Jersey of the U.S. Department of Housing and Urban Development on January 18, 2022.

References

External links
Councilwoman Alicka Ampry-Samuel official site
Biographical sketch in The New Yorker

Living people
New York (state) Democrats
New York City Council members
People from Brownsville, Brooklyn
21st-century American politicians
21st-century American women politicians
African-American New York City Council members
Women New York City Council members
1976 births
21st-century African-American women
21st-century African-American politicians
20th-century African-American people
20th-century African-American women